Greenwood, Bath County was an unincorporated community in Bath County, Virginia, in the United States.
Greenwood was abandoned and later flooded due to the construction of Lake Moomaw.

References

Unincorporated communities in Bath County, Virginia
Unincorporated communities in Virginia